Bandino Panciatici (10 July 1629 – 21 April 1718) as a Roman Catholic cardinal from 1690 to 1718.

Biography

Bandino Panciatici was born in Florence on July 10, 1629.  He came from a Pistoian noble family, and was a relative of Pope Clement IX. He was educated at the University of Pisa, receiving a doctorate in law.

After university, he traveled to Rome and practiced law with Giambattista De Luca.  When his relative became Pope Clement IX in 1667, he entered the papal household.  He became secondo collaterale of the Roman Curia.  A short time after that, he became lieutenant of the auditor of the Apostolic Camera.  When Pope Clement X was elected in 1670, he resigned to respect the laws of justice (non mancare ai doveri della giustizia), returning to Florence.  In 1678, he was recalled to Rome by Pope Innocent XI to become secretary of the S.C. of the Apostolic Visit and of the State of Regulars.  He then became S.C. of Bishops and Regulars in 1686.  He later became Referendary of the Tribunals of the Apostolic Signature of Justice and of Grace.

On October 7, 1689, he became prodatary of the Apostolic Dataria.  On October 14, 1689, he became Titular Patriarch of Jerusalem, with dispensation for not having yet received Holy Orders.  He was consecrated as a bishop in Rome by Cardinal Gasparo Carpegna on December 21, 1689.  On January 25, 1690, he was named Assistant at the Pontifical Throne.

The pope made him a cardinal priest at the consistory of February 13, 1690.  On April 10, 1690, he received the red hat and the titular church of San Tommaso in Parione.  He participated in the papal conclave of 1691 that elected Pope Innocent XII.  He was confirmed as prodatary by the new pope on July 14, 1690.  He opted for the titular church of San Pancrazio on August 8, 1691.  He became Camerlengo of the Sacred College of Cardinals in 1699, holding that office until February 3, 1700.  He participated in the papal conclave of 1700 that elected Pope Clement XI.  The new pope offered him the position of Cardinal Secretary of State, but he declined because of his age.  He did, however, agree to serve as prefect of the S.C. of the Tridentine Council, assuming that office on December 4, 1700.  He exchanged his titular church for Santa Prassede on February 19, 1710.

He died at his residence, the Palazzo Bolognetti on April 21, 1718.  He was initially buried in San Pancrazio, but later re-interred in his family's traditional burial place, the Basilica of Santa Maria Novella in Florence.

Episcopal succession
While bishop, he was the principal consecrator of:

and the principal co-consecrator of:
Pietro Priuli, Bishop of Bergamo (1708).

References

External links and additional sources
 (for Chronology of Bishops) 
 (for Chronology of Bishops) 

1629 births
1718 deaths
18th-century Italian cardinals
Cardinals created by Pope Alexander VIII
Latin Patriarchs of Jerusalem